Crónica de Dos Grandes (Eng.: Chronicle of Two Idols) is a compilation album released by the Mexican groups Los Bukis and Bronco. This album became the third number-one album for Los Bukis and the second for Bronco in the Billboard Top Latin Albums chart. A special edition was released in 2005 titled Crónica de Dos Grandes: Recuerdos con Amor.

Track listing
This information from Billboard.com.

CD track listing

DVD track listing
This information from Allmusic.

Chart performance
Standard edition

Recuerdos con Amor edition

References

Los Bukis compilation albums
Grupo Bronco compilation albums
2004 greatest hits albums
2004 video albums
Music video compilation albums